This is a list of squads of the 2015 FIFA Women's World Cup, an international women's association football tournament that was held in Canada from 6 June until 5 July 2015. The 24 national teams involved in the tournament were required to register a squad of 23 players, including three goalkeepers. Only players in these squads were eligible to take part in the tournament. The deadline to submit squads to FIFA was 25 May 2015.

Totals for caps and goals, club affiliations, and ages are as of the opening day of the tournament on 6 June 2015.

Group A

Canada
Head coach:  John Herdman

The final 23-player squad was announced on 27 April 2015.

China PR
Head coach: Hao Wei

A 29-player provisional squad was revealed on 17 April 2015, which was reduced to 25 players on 14 May 2015. The final 23-player squad was announced on 28 May 2015.

Netherlands
Head coach: Roger Reijners

The final 23-player squad was announced on 10 May 2015. Claudia van den Heiligenberg was ruled out because on an injury and was replaced by Shanice van de Sanden.

New Zealand
Head coach:  Tony Readings

A 20-player squad was announced on 19 March 2015. The final roster was revealed on 14 May 2015.

Group B

Germany
Head coach: Silvia Neid

A 27-player preliminary roster was announced on 11 May 2015. The final squad was revealed on 24 May 2015.

Ivory Coast
Head coach: Clémentine Touré

A 23-player squad was announced on 15 May 2015.

Norway
Head coach: Even Pellerud

A 35-player preliminary squad was revealed on 23 April 2015.
The final 23-player squad was announced on 13 May. Caroline Graham Hansen was ruled out because on an injury and was replaced by Anja Sønstevold.

Thailand
Head coach: Nuengrutai Srathongvian

A 28-player squad was announced on 19 May 2015. The final squad was named on 26 May 2015. On 6 June 2015, Nattaya Duanjanthuek replaced Irravadee Makris.

Group C

Cameroon
Head coach: Carl Enow

A 25-player squad was announced on 17 April 2015.

Ecuador
Head coach: Vanessa Arauz

A 25-player squad was announced on 24 April 2015. The final squad was revealed on 15 May 2015.

Japan
Head coach: Norio Sasaki

The roster was announced on 1 May 2015.

Switzerland
Head coach:  Martina Voss-Tecklenburg

A 27-player squad was announced on 13 May 2015. The final 23-player squad was announced on 22 May 2015.

Group D

Australia
Head coach: Alen Stajcic

The final 23-player squad was announced on 12 May 2015.

Nigeria
Head coach: Edwin Okon

A 26-player squad was announced on 19 May 2015. The final squad was named on 27 May 2015.

Sweden
Head coach: Pia Sundhage

The final 23-player squad was announced on 11 May 2015.

United States
Head coach: Jill Ellis

The final 23-player squad was announced on 14 April 2015.

Group E

Brazil
Head coach: Vadão

The squad was announced on 25 May 2015. On the eve of the tournament, Rafinha was called in to replace Érika, who withdrew with a knee injury.

Costa Rica
Head coach: Amelia Valverde

The squad was announced on 20 May 2015.

South Korea
Head coach: Yoon Deok-yeo

A 23-player squad was announced on 30 April 2015.

Spain
Head coach: Ignacio Quereda

The final 23-player squad was announced on 11 May 2015.

Group F

Colombia
Head coach: Fabián Taborda

A 25-player squad was announced on 1 May 2015. The final roster was revealed on 20 May 2015. On 2 June 2015, Lina Granados was called up to replace the injured Melissa Ortiz.

England
Head coach:  Mark Sampson

The squad was announced on 11 May 2015.

France
Head coach: Philippe Bergeroo

The final 23-player squad on 23 April 2015.

Mexico
Head coach: Leonardo Cuéllar

A 24-player squad was announced on 11 May 2015. The final roster was published on 20 May 2015.

References

External links

Squads
2015